Tora Dine Ku Mora Dine is a 2016 Indian Odia action comedy-drama film directed by Sudhanshu Mohan Sahu. Arindam Roy, Amlan, Riya Dey and Sheetal Patra are in lead roles. It released to negative reviews and was declared as a flop.

Cast
 Arindam Roy
 Amlan Das
 Riya Dey
 Shital Patra
 Mihir Das
 Pragyan

Soundtrack

The music of  Tora Dine Ku Mora Dine  is composed by Malaya Mishra while the lyrics are penned by Mohit Chakraborty, Bapu Goswami and Arun Mantri . The full soundtrack was launched on 1 October 2016.

References

2016 films
2010s Odia-language films
Indian comedy-drama films
2016 comedy-drama films
Films directed by Sudhanshu Sahu